Nagaoka may refer to:

Places
 Nagaoka, Niigata, Japan
 Nagaoka-kyō, the capital of Japan from 784 to 794
 Nagaokakyō, Kyoto, Japan, a city at the location of Nagaoka-kyō
 Izunagaoka, Shizuoka, Japan, a former town in Izu Peninsula

People with the surname
, Japanese footballer
, Japanese physicist responsible for the 1904 "Saturnian" model of atomic structure
, Japanese ski jumper
, Japanese women's basketball player
, Japanese volleyball player
, Japanese religious leader
, Japanese illustrator
, Japanese speed skater
, Japanese shogi player

Other uses
Nagaoka (crater), a lunar crater named after Hantaro Nagaoka

Japanese-language surnames